Bridge of Don is a five-arch bridge of granite, built between 1827 and 1830, crossing the River Don just above its mouth in Aberdeen, Scotland.

History
In 1605 Alexander Hay executed a Charter of Mortification for the maintenance of the 13th century Brig o' Balgownie further upstream, which later became the Bridge of Don Fund, which financed several bridges in the north-east of Scotland.

The original design by John Gibb and John Smith was modified by Thomas Telford, and construction work started in 1827. Problems with the foundations meant it had to be partly taken down and have additional piles sunk. It was opened free to the public with no toll in 1830 and later gave its name to the suburb of the city on the north bank.

It was listed as a Category B listed building in 1967.

Design

The bridge has five spans of dressed granite, and rounded cutwaters that carry up to road level to form pedestrian refuges.

It now carries four lanes of the A956 road, and is the last bridge on the River Don before it meets the sea. The bridge is just downstream from a substantial island in the river. Around the area of the bridge is the Donmouth Local Nature Reserve, designated as a LNR in 1992. Near to the bridge are a number of World War II era coastal defences, including a pill box.

References

Road bridges in Scotland
Category B listed buildings in Aberdeen
Listed bridges in Scotland
Viaducts in Scotland
Bridges in Aberdeen
Bridges completed in 1830
1830 establishments in Scotland